Turu Rizzo (13 March 1894 – 23 May 1961) was a Maltese water polo player. He competed in the men's tournament at the 1928 Summer Olympics.

References

External links
 

1894 births
1961 deaths
Maltese male water polo players
Olympic water polo players of Malta
Water polo players at the 1928 Summer Olympics
People from Sliema